Maurice Gourdault-Montagne CMG, CVO (born on 16 November 1953) is a career diplomat and former French Ambassador to China, Japan, the United Kingdom and Germany.

Career
Mr Gourdault-Montagne joined the French Foreign Ministry in 1978. He served as first secretary at the French embassy in New Delhi (1981–83), counsellor in Bonn (1988–91), then as spokesman for the French Foreign Ministry (1991–93) and deputy private secretary to the minister of foreign affairs (1993–95). He became private secretary and head of the Prime Minister's Office (1995–97). He served as the ambassador to Japan (1998–2002) and became senior diplomatic advisor and G8 sherpa to the French President Jacques Chirac (2002–07). He was appointed as French ambassador to the United Kingdom in 2007 and became ambassador to Germany on 14 March 2011. On 20 August 2014, he was appointed ambassador to China.

References

1953 births
Living people
Commandeurs of the Légion d'honneur
Companions of the Order of St Michael and St George
Commanders of the Royal Victorian Order
Ambassadors of France to China
Ambassadors of France to Germany
Ambassadors of France to the United Kingdom
Ambassadors of France to Japan
Sciences Po alumni
Paris 2 Panthéon-Assas University alumni
Knights Commander of the Order of Merit of the Federal Republic of Germany
20th-century French diplomats
21st-century French diplomats